Propaganda in Italy may refer to:
 Propaganda and censorship in Italy during the First World War
 Propaganda in Fascist Italy